Pål Henning Jonson (born 30 May 1972) is a Swedish politician of the Moderate Party. He has served as Minister for Defence in the cabinet of Ulf Kristersson since 2022.

Biography 
Jonson was born on 30 May 1972, in Älgö on the northwestern shore of Lake Glafsfjord (Göta-Älv basin). Parents are farmers Bo Jonson and Marya Jonson.

In 1991 he graduated from the sports gymnasium in Luxel. In 1998 he graduated from Georgetown University, where he studied international politics and received a bachelor's degree. He graduated with a Master of Arts in European politics from the College of Europe in 1999. In 2005, he completed his Ph.D. in military science from King's College London.

From 2000 to 2005, he worked as an analyst at the Swedish Defence Research Institute.

From 2005 to 2006, he was the head of the Moderates' office in the European Parliament.

From 2006 to 2007, he was a political scientist at the Ministry of Defence of Sweden.

From 2007 to 2012 he was a political expert of the Moderate apparatus in the Riksdag.

In 2009, he was a visiting researcher at the NATO Defense College (NDC).

From 2013 to 2016, he was the Communications Director of Säkerhets- och försvarsföretagen (SOFF), a defense and security policy organization.

Since 2006 - municipal deputy in Arvika.

From 2010 to 2012 he was the chairman of the Moderates in the county of Värmland.

2013-2015 Secretary of the non-profit defense and security policy organization Allmänna Försvarsföreningen (AFF) in the county of Värmland, 2013-2016 Secretary General of the defense and security policy organization Svenska Atlantkommittén (SAK) security.

He is also a member of the Riksdag for Värmland County  since 2016, when he ascended to the position following Pia Hallström's death.

References

1972 births
Living people
People from Arvika Municipality
Alumni of King's College London
Members of the Riksdag 2014–2018
Members of the Riksdag 2018–2022
Members of the Riksdag 2022–2026
Members of the Riksdag from the Moderate Party
Swedish Ministers for Defence
21st-century Swedish politicians